Yuri Mitev (6 February 1958 – 11 August 2022) was a Bulgarian biathlete. He competed at the 1980 Winter Olympics and the 1984 Winter Olympics.

Mitev died on 11 August 2022, at the age of 64.

References

External links
 

1958 births
2022 deaths
Bulgarian male biathletes
Olympic biathletes of Bulgaria
Biathletes at the 1980 Winter Olympics
Biathletes at the 1984 Winter Olympics
Sportspeople from Haskovo Province
20th-century Bulgarian people
21st-century Bulgarian people